General Sanders may refer to:

John C. C. Sanders (1840–1864), Confederate States Army brigadier general
Patrick Sanders (British Army officer) (born 1966), British Army general
Richard C. Sanders (1915–1976), U.S. Air Force brigadier general
William P. Sanders (1833–1863), Union Army brigadier general (unconfirmed)

See also
Erwin Sander (1892–1962), German Wehrmacht lieutenant general
Mary Saunders (fl. 1970s–2000s), U.S. Air Force major general
Otto Liman von Sanders (1855−1929), German and Ottoman general